The University of Warwick Boat Club is the rowing club of the University of Warwick. It club was founded in 1967 and as of 2019 has over a hundred members. It rows out of a boathouse on a 3.5 km stretch of the River Avon, Warwickshire. It caters for all levels of rowers from novices to experienced oarsman. The club regularly attends races throughout the United Kingdom, including Pairs Head, Fours Head, Eights Head, BUCS fours and eights, BUCS Regatta, Marlow Regatta and Henley. 

Notable former members include Oxford University Boat Club member and Boat Race winner Ben Ellison, Olympian Tom Solesbury, and Team GB para-rowing coxswain Oliver James MBE.

The club was known internationally for the nude wall calendars produced by its members, first as 'Warwick Rowers' later as 'Worldwide Roar'. However, the club and the calendar are no longer affiliated.

Facilities
The club's facilities include 6 Concept2 ergos, kept in the Boathouse.  The club's men's 1st VIII rows in a 2011 wing-rigged Hudson Boatworks and the women's 1st VIII rows in a 2015 Filippi Boats.  The club owns four further eights, three fours, and numerous small boats.

The club trains out of a rebuilt boathouse on a 3.5 km stretch of the River Avon south of Warwick Castle.

History

The University of Warwick was established in 1965; during the first year there was no rowing club associated with the university. In 1966 there were several undergraduates who had previous rowing experience at their Schools, these undergraduates began by boating out of Stratford Rowing Club. With the first race being in a Coxed Pair, borrowed from Stratford R.C.

During the academic year 1967-68 John Fawthrop and Godfrey Bishop, the Clubs Treasurer and Captain respectively, had started the process of registering the club with ARA (now British Rowing), as well as designing the first kit with the notable red, white and black colours. It was at this stage that the club began to attract many new members, which Stratford RC weren't able to accommodate. So the search started for a location to build the boathouse and a stretch of river to row on. 

Godfrey began looking at the local Ordnance Survey map to examine a suitable stretch of the River Avon. He was able to borrow a canoe; and paddled down the river Avon from Warwick Castle to the little village of Barford. After leaving Warwick Castle behind he stumbled across a gold mine; the river opened up to reveal a stretch wide enough for side by side racing. 

After some research it was found out that the land was owned by a Mr Smith-Ryland, Lord Lieutenant of Warwickshire and a keen supporter of youth sport. Through Mr Bruce-Lockhart, the university's Development Officer, the club was able to set up a meeting with Mr Smith-Ryland, who could not have been more helpful. He drove them to a site alongside the river which was deemed suitable and agreed access across his farmland. 

Once a suitable stretch of river was found for the Boathouse to be built on, the club set about purchasing a few boats and oars. Two coxed IV's from Wallingford RC, a new Sims coxless IV, and oars from Kingston Rowing Club. 

The first boat entered under the name UWBC was a IV-
Bow: Godfrey Bishop
2: John Fawthrop
3: Dave Brown (ex Bedford Modern School)
Stroke: Diegan Morris (ex Radley College)
Coach: Henry Hatton (Leander and Stratford RC)

Land training began at Woodlands School, Coventry (the university currently had no sports centre). Boats were kept under the flood arch of the new motorway bridge until the Boathouse was built in August 1968. 

The club first completed in Eights Head of the River Race in 1970. 

Since then a new Boathouse has been built (2010), due to the increase in the number of boats the club owns. And the site has undergone various upgrades including a new floating pontoon.

Ursus Boat Club
The club's alumni maintain strong links with the club through the Warwick Graduate Boat Club, Ursus. Members of Ursus and UWBC regularly compete. The club hosts an annual ball, which sees some friendly side by side racing between Ursus and current UWBC members, before having a sit down meal in the evening.

Ursus was set up in 2002 by alumni Ken Loveday and Mark Williams with the help of the executive committee for that year. The newly established boat club had two primary functions, firstly to enable old friends to keep in touch with each other and the club and secondly to help with the purchasing of new equipment for UWBC.

Alumni of the club include Boat Race winner Ben Ellison and Olympic rower Tom Solesbury.

Training Camps
The club attends two annual training camps, as well as numerous away days paddling against other crews. In previous years the club has boated from Reading Rowing Club, Walbrook Rowing Club, Dorney Lake for their Winter training camp. Typically the Spring training camp is held abroad, the club has attended training camps at Tilburg, Netherlands; Banyoles, Spain; Mimizan, France.

Warwick Rowers / Worldwide Roar calendars
In 2009, members of the men's team began independently producing an annual wall calendar featuring them modeling nude, as 'Warwick Rowers', donating the proceeds from sales to help fund the team. In 2012 they began donating proceeds from sales of the calendar as well as related media and merchandise to Sport Allies, an independent charity created by them 'to reach out to young people challenged by bullying, homophobia or low self-esteem'. With the university fully funding the club, Sport Allies later became the sole beneficiary of the Warwick Rowers. In 2011 the women's team began producing a similar calendar featuring its rowers, sharing proceeds with Macmillan Cancer Support. In 2019, 'Warwick Rowers' rebranded itself as 'Worldwide Roar'.

References

External links 
 University of Warwick Boat Club official site
 Worldwide Roar official site

University of Warwick
Rowing clubs in England
Warwick
1966 establishments in England 
Sports clubs established in 1966
Rowing clubs of the River Avon